Eric Harrison Jr. (born 18 February 1999) is an American athlete who represents Trinidad and Tobago. He competed in the men's 4 × 100 metres relay event at the 2020 Summer Olympics. Harrison's mother is from Trinidad, and became eligible to represent Trinidad and Tobago on 15 July 2021.

Harrison comes from Washington, D.C. Representing the United States at the 2018 IAAF World U20 Championships in Tampere, Finland, Harrison won a gold medal and two bronze medals. He won gold in the men's 4 × 100 metres relay, and bronze in thee 100 metres and the 200 metres.

Initially, Harrison missed the trials for the 2020 Summer Olympics because of illness, but he later qualified for the Trinidad and Tobago relay team based on his results in the 100 metres. His training was also impacted by the COVID-19 pandemic, with the indoor track season being cancelled in March 2020.

References

External links
 

1999 births
Living people
Trinidad and Tobago male sprinters
Athletes (track and field) at the 2020 Summer Olympics
Olympic athletes of Trinidad and Tobago
Track and field athletes from Washington, D.C.
American sportspeople of Trinidad and Tobago descent
Ohio State Buckeyes men's track and field athletes
Commonwealth Games silver medallists for Trinidad and Tobago
Commonwealth Games medallists in athletics
Athletes (track and field) at the 2022 Commonwealth Games
Medallists at the 2022 Commonwealth Games